Amerila affinis is a moth of the  subfamily Arctiinae. It was described by Rothschild in 1910. It is found in the Democratic Republic of Congo, Ethiopia, Ghana, Kenya, Malawi, Mozambique, South Africa, Tanzania and Zimbabwe.

References

Moths described in 1910
Amerilini
Moths of Sub-Saharan Africa